Vale of Bannock Football Club was a Scottish association football club based in the town of Bannockburn, Stirlingshire. The club was founded in 1880 and disbanded in 1894. The club competed in the Scottish Cup for five seasons between 1886 and 1890 as well as the regional Stirlingshire Cup competition. The club's home colours were navy and red striped jerseys with white shorts.

References 

Defunct football clubs in Scotland
Association football clubs established in 1880
1880 establishments in Scotland
Association football clubs disestablished in 1894
1894 disestablishments in Scotland
Football clubs in Stirling (council area)